In computer science, an operator or function is variadic if it can take a varying number of arguments; that is, if its arity is not fixed.

For specific articles, see:
 Variadic function
 Variadic macro in the C preprocessor
 Variadic template
 Variadic templates in C++11

Programming language theory